The 1989 Giro d'Italia was the 72nd edition of the Giro d'Italia, one of cycling's Grand Tours. The Giro began in Taormina, with a flat stage on 21 May, and Stage 12 occurred on 1 June with a stage to Mira. The race finished in Florence on 11 June.

Stage 1
21 May 1989 — Taormina to Catania,

Stage 2
22 May 1989 — Catania to Mount Etna,

Stage 3
23 May 1989 — Villafranca Tirrena to Messina,  (TTT)

Stage 4
24 May 1989 — Scilla to Cosenza,

Stage 5
25 May 1989 — Cosenza to Potenza,

Stage 6
26 May 1989 — Potenza to Campobasso,

Stage 7
27 May 1989 — Isernia to Rome,

Stage 8
28 May 1989 — Rome to Gran Sasso d'Italia,

Stage 9
29 May 1989 — L'Aquila to Gubbio,

Stage 10
30 May 1989 — Pesaro to Riccione,  (ITT)

Stage 11
31 May 1989 — Riccione to Mantua,

Stage 12
1 June 1989 — Mantua to Mira,

References

1989 Giro d'Italia
Giro d'Italia stages